Pitrilysin (Escherichia coli protease III, protease Pi, proteinase Pi, PTR, Escherichia coli metalloproteinase Pi) is an enzyme. This enzyme catalyses the following chemical reaction:

 Preferential cleavage of -Tyr16- Leu- and -Phe25- Tyr-bonds of oxidized insulin B chain. Also acts on other substrates of less than 7 kDa such as glucagon

This enzyme is present in bacteria Escherichia coli.

References

External links 
 

EC 3.4.24